Robert Wade King  (June 20, 1906 – July 29, 1965) was an American athlete, who won a gold medal in the high jump at the 1928 Summer Olympics with a jump of 1.93 m. His personal best was 1.997 m, achieved earlier that year. After graduating from Stanford University, King studied in a medical school and later became a prominent obstetrician.

References

American male high jumpers
Olympic gold medalists for the United States in track and field
Athletes (track and field) at the 1928 Summer Olympics
Stanford Cardinal men's track and field athletes
1906 births
1965 deaths
Track and field athletes from Los Angeles
Medalists at the 1928 Summer Olympics